Lomano Lemeki (レメキロマノラヴァ, born 20 January 1989) is a New Zealand born Tongan - Japanese rugby union player. He plays for Japan's sevens team and for the Honda Heat in Japan's Top League.

Lemeki grew up in New Zealand before moving to Japan in 2009. He helped Japan win the 2013 Thailand Sevens when he scored the match-winning try against  to seal their victory. He married a Japanese woman and received Japanese citizenship in 2014.

References

External links
 
 Lomano Lemeki at honda-heat.jp
 

1989 births
Living people
Japanese rugby union players
Japanese people of Tongan descent
Japan international rugby union players
New Zealand emigrants to Japan
New Zealand sportspeople of Tongan descent
Asian Games medalists in rugby union
Rugby union players at the 2014 Asian Games
Mie Honda Heat players
Rugby sevens players at the 2016 Summer Olympics
Olympic rugby sevens players of Japan
Japanese rugby sevens players
Asian Games gold medalists for Japan
Medalists at the 2014 Asian Games
Japan international rugby sevens players
People educated at Liston College
Sunwolves players
Rugby union wings
Munakata Sanix Blues players
Green Rockets Tokatsu players